Tunisia first participated at the Olympic Games in 1960, and has sent athletes to compete in every Summer Olympic Games except when they participated in the American-led boycott of the 1980 Summer Olympics and has never participated in the Winter Olympic Games.

Tunisian athletes have won a total of 15 medals, including four by the great long-distance runner Mohammed Gammoudi in men's athletics, three in men's swimming two by long-distance swimmer Oussama Mellouli and one by Ahmed Ayoub Hafnaoui, two in men's boxing, one in women's athletics, one in women's fencing and two in men's taekwondo.

The National Olympic Committee for Tunisia was created in 1957.

History

1960 to 1980 

Tunisia first took part in the 1960 Summer Olympics in Rome. The 45 men competed in athletics, Boxing, Fencing, Cycling, Modern pentathlon, Shooting and Football. The first Olympians came from the boxing relay. On 25 August 1960, the bantamweight Tahar Ben Hassan, the lightweight Noureddine Dziri, the light welterweight Azouz Bechir and the welterweight Omrane Sadok came to their first-round bouts.

The first medals were won in 1964 Summer Olympics in Tokyo. Tunisia's first medalist was Mohammed Gammoudi on 14 October 1964, who won silver in the 10,000 meter. Boxer Habib Galhia won the light welterweight bronze a week later. A Tunisian judoka took part in Tokyo for the first time. In Mexico City 1968 Gammoudi was able to triple his medal haul. In addition to winning a bronze medal in the 10,000 meters, he became Tunisia's first Olympic champion in the 5,000 meters on 15October  1968. At 1972 Summer Olympics in Munich, handball players, volleyball players and a wrestler competed for the first time. Mohammed Gammoudi won his fourth Olympic medal with silver in the 5000 meters. So far (2020) he is the Tunisian with the most medals at the Olympic Games.

Tunisia was one of the few African countries to take part in the 1976 Summer Olympics in Montreal. The athletes were not used, but swimmers took part for the first time. In addition, a Tunisian woman started in Montreal for the first time. Myriam Mizouni became the country's first Olympian on 18 July 1976 in the 100-meter freestyle heats. The country immediately joined the US-led boycott of the 1980 Summer Olympics in Moscow.

1984 to 2000 
At 1984 Summer Olympics in Los Angeles, Tunisian weightlifters took part for the first time. In Boxing, Lotfi Belkhir reached the quarterfinals at light welterweight. In Seoul 1988, Tunisian table tennis players made their Olympic debut. The football selection met in the preliminary round the team from West Germany, which later won bronze, and lost 1–4. At 1992 Summer Olympics in Barcelona, in which a sports sailor competed for the first time, were unsuccessful for the Tunisian team.

It was not until 1996 in Atlanta that a medal could be celebrated again. Boxer Fethi Missaoui won bronze at light welterweight. In athletics, Ali Hakimi reached the 1500m final and finished eighth. In Atlanta, a Tunisian tennis player took part for the first time. Tunisian rowers made their Olympic debut in Sydney in 2000. The team was also unsuccessful in 2000 Sydney.

2004 to present 

At 2004 Summer Olympics in Athens, Tunisian Taekwondoin and a gymnast competed for the first time. Swimmer Oussama Mellouli reached the final in the 400m individual medley and finished 5th. In women's weightlifting, Hayet Sassi finished 4th in the middleweight division. The taekwondoin Hichem Hamdouni was able to reach the quarterfinals in the welterweight division. Saber fencer Azza Besbes also reached the quarterfinals.

After 40 years, a Tunisian Olympic victory was celebrated again at 2008 Summer Olympics in Beijing. Oussama Mellouli won the 1500m freestyle final after finishing fifth in the 400m freestyle. Boxer Walid Cherif reached the flyweight quarterfinals. In London 2012, basketball players and canoeists competed for the first time. Oussama Mellouli won bronze in the 1500 meter freestyle and became Olympic champion in the 10 km open water swim. This makes Mellouli Tunisia's first double Olympic champion. He is also the first swimmer to win both indoor (1500m freestyle in Beijing 2008) and outdoor (10 km open water 2012 in London) olympic gold medals.

Track and field athlete Habiba Ghribi took second place in the 3,000 meter steeplechase race. The winner, the Russian Yuliya Zaripova, was found guilty of doping in 2015 and disqualified. Ghribi moved up accordingly and was subsequently declared Olympic champion on 4 June 2016. Boxer Maroua Rahali reached the quarterfinals in the flyweight division. The Tunisian fencer also achieved top placements. Inès Boubakri was sixth in the foil, epee fencer Sarra Besbes eighth, her sister Azza Bebes ninth with the sabre. At 2016 Summer Olympics in Rio de Janeiro, the Tunisian team won three bronze medals. Inès Boubakri won her medal in foil fencing, Marwa Amri in freestyle wrestling in the 58 kg class and Oussama Oueslati in welterweight taekwondo. Beach volleyball players from Tunisia competed in Rio de Janeiro for the first time.

Medal tables

Medals by Summer Games

Medals by sport

List of medalists

See also
 List of flag bearers for Tunisia at the Olympics
 :Category:Olympic competitors for Tunisia
 Tunisia at the Paralympics

External links
 
 
 

 
Olympics